Notagogus (from  , 'back' and  , 'leader') is an extinct genus of prehistoric bony fish. They can be found in the Solnhofen Plattenkalk.

See also

 Prehistoric fish
 List of prehistoric bony fish

References

Prehistoric bony fish genera
Solnhofen fauna
Macrosemiiformes
Taxa named by Louis Agassiz